Renaud Ewaldt van Neel (born 23 May 1988) is a former Namibian rugby union player who played as a lock represented Namibia internationally from 2011 to 2012 and played for the University of Namibia where he also finished his graduation.

Renaud van Neel was included as an uncapped player in the Namibian squad for the 2011 Rugby World Cup. He made his World Cup debut in a group stage match against Samoa on 14 September 2011, which was also his only World Cup match appearance.

References 

1988 births
Living people
Namibia international rugby union players
Namibian rugby union players
Rugby union flankers
Rugby union locks
Rugby union players from Windhoek
University of Namibia alumni